Indian Institute of Science Education and Research, Tirupati commonly referred as IISER Tirupati, is an autonomous public university in Tirupati, Andhra Pradesh, India. It has been established by the Ministry of Human Resource Development, in order to promote Higher Scientific Learning and Research as well as Scientific Exploration at the Undergraduate and Postgraduate levels of education and to create Scientists and Academicians. 

IISER Tirupati is recognized as an Institute of National Importance by the Government of India. This new institute started functioning from the 2015 academic year in the month of August. IISER Pune mentored this institute till the new director was appointed.

History
The institute was allocated to state of Andhra Pradesh as part of the AP bifurcation bill. The foundation stone of IISER Tirupati was laid on 28 March 2015 by the Union human resources minister, Smriti Irani & Chief Minister of Andhra Pradesh,  N. Chandrababu Naidu. 

Initially the institute has started its work from a transit campus in the Sree Rama Educational society, Tirupati. The Andhra Pradesh government has allocated a piece of land of over 250 acres for the permanent campus which is slated to be completed in the next few years.

Academic programs
IISER Tirupati is initially offering Integrated Master's level (B.S.-M.S.): Admission to this program is after 10+2 years of school training and is currently done in co-ordination with the other IISERs through a Joint Admission Programme.

Facilities 
It has laboratories equipped with world class instruments and the class rooms are also properly equipped with projectors. The faculty consists of teachers who are presently associated with research works so that they can provide the students with proper insight into the world of science. The institute hosts Science Colloquiums which introduce the students to variety of people and famous scientists which inspires them.

The building hosts a mess for dining facility. The boys and girls hostel is itself in the same building. The building has a gym with high end work out equipment. There is a TV room, a library with a variety of books, a computer room, a basketball court, cricket ground, football ground and a  badminton court also.

Clubs 
The college apart from its academics has different clubs looking into different matters. The clubs are usually led by teachers and the tasks are undertaken by students. The different clubs are - Prakriti club, Creative Filming club, Movie club, Sports club, Shemushi or the quiz club, Bio-wissen club, Math club, Literary club Physics club, Chemistry club, Math club, Fovea photography club and CELESTIC (official Astronomy club).

See also 
 Indian Institutes of Science Education and Research
 National Institute of Science Education and Research
 IISER Pune

External links

 IISER Tirupati Website

References

Tirupati
Universities and colleges in Tirupati
Research institutes in Andhra Pradesh
2015 establishments in Andhra Pradesh
Research institutes established in 2015